(1880–1964) was a Japanese judoka. He was one of the longest living 10th dan (belt degree) judo practitioners in the world.

He joined the Kodokan in 1898 and was awarded his 10th dan in April 1948. In 1899 he became head of the judo section at Dai Nippon Butoku Kai, and in 1931 he began teaching at the Kodokan in Tokyo.

He traveled extensively and taught judo at various schools and police academies.

External links 
 judoinfo.com Profiles of Kodokan 10th Dan Holders

Japanese male judoka
Kodokan 10th dans
1880 births
1964 deaths
19th-century Japanese people
20th-century Japanese people